Blumenthal is a municipality in the district of Rendsburg-Eckernförde, in Schleswig-Holstein, Germany.

Geography and transport

Blumenthal is located about 8 milles southwest of Kiel at the Bundesautobahn 215.

Economy

The town was originally agrarian-oriented, but now because of its proximity to the state capital Kiel, the residential use of land predominates.

Politics

Of the nine seats in the municipal council, the SPD has four seats since the local elections in 2008, the Freie Wähler ABW three and the CDU two.

References

Municipalities in Schleswig-Holstein
Rendsburg-Eckernförde